The J. Hawkins Hart House, at 630 Center St. in Henderson, Kentucky, is a Queen Anne-style house which was built in 1892.  It was listed on the National Register of Historic Places in 2011.

It is believed to have been built to a design by architect George Franklin Barber.

It was described in the Kaintuckean asBuilt in 1892 as a domestic single family dwelling in the Queen Anne style for [J. Hawkins] Hart who began his political career in the City as a court clerk. While living in the house, he would become a county judge, a city commissioner, have a private legal practice, and own his own real estate and insurance business. After the house passed out of the Hart family, it belonged to a succession of middle- to upper-class citizens of the town, including prominent doctors and businessmen. It has remained a single family dwelling throughout. There is strong evidence that the house was designed by the popular mail order architect, George F. Barber, whose designs helped disseminate the Queen Anne style throughout the United States in the late-19th century.  The house exhibits numerous hallmarks of Barber design and is an excellent example of Queen Anne architecture in the city. Its architectural significance is interpreted within the historic context, “George F. Barber and Queen Anne Style in Henderson, Kentucky.” The house’s scale, ornamentation, and location give important cues to post-Civil War socioeconomic development in Henderson.

It is also a contributing building in the Alves Historic District, which was listed on the National Register.

References

National Register of Historic Places in Henderson County, Kentucky
Queen Anne architecture in Kentucky
Houses completed in 1892
1892 establishments in Kentucky
Houses on the National Register of Historic Places in Kentucky
Individually listed contributing properties to historic districts on the National Register in Kentucky
Henderson, Kentucky